"Laisse parler les gens" (Let People Talk) is a song  released in the summer of 2003 in Europe, Africa and in the Caribbeans. The song features Jocelyne Labylle, Cheela, Passi and Jacob Desvarieux. It is Afro-Zouk and is from the album Dis L'heure 2 Zouk. The song sold more than a million copies and was nominated for Victoires de la musique. This song was the summer anthem of 2003 in France, Belgium (where it was a number-one hit), Africa, and the Caribbean. As of August 2014, the song was the 12th best-selling single of the 21st century in France, with 640,000 units sold.

Track listings
 CD single
 "Laisse parler les gens" — 3:21
 "L'anmitié bell" by Dersion & Lynnsha — 4:26

Charts and sales

Peak positions

Year-end charts

Certifications

References

2003 singles
Passi songs
Ultratop 50 Singles (Wallonia) number-one singles
SNEP Top Singles number-one singles